Adamowice may refer to the following places:
Adamowice, Lesser Poland Voivodeship (south Poland)
Adamowice, Łódź Voivodeship (central Poland)
Adamowice, Masovian Voivodeship (east-central Poland)
Adamowice, Silesian Voivodeship (south Poland)
Adamowice, Opole Voivodeship (south-west Poland)